Anton Aloys, Prince of Hohenzollern-Sigmaringen (20 June 1762 – 17 October 1831) was Prince of Hohenzollern-Sigmaringen.

Anton Aloys was the son of Prince Karl Friedrich, Prince of Hohenzollern-Sigmaringen (1724–1785) and his wife Johanna (1727–1787), daughter of Count Franz Wilhelm of Hohenzollern-Berg. Anton Aloys was born during the Seven Years' War and grew up mostly in 'Bergh-'s-Heerenberg on his mother's Dutch estate. His father participated in the War, so his mother lived there with her brother. Later he was educated at the universities of Freiburg, Heidelberg and Ingolstadt. He married on 13 August 1782 at Schloss Dhaun, Amalie Zephyrine (1760–1841), the daughter of Philipp Joseph, Prince of Salm-Kyrburg.

In 1785 he succeeded his father, and two years later after his mother's death inherited her rich Dutch estates through the county of Bergh-s'Heerenberg. In 1789 the Brabant Revolution took place in the Austrian Netherlands, which Anton Aloys followed intently due to his possessions there. At the 1790 coronation of Emperor Leopold II of the House of Habsburg-Lotharingia, Anton Aloys held the office of Lord Chamberlain. At the outbreak of the French Revolutionary Wars, Anton Aloys fled to Vienna, and returned again in 1796. France received from Germany the territories on the left Rhine, so Anton Aloys lost all his Dutch estates in 1802. As compensation he received the territory of Glatt in the northern Black Forest, and the old monasteries of Inzigkofen, Beuron and Holzen.

Issue
He married Princess Amalie Zephyrine of Salm-Kyrburg in 1782 and was the father of: 
 Charles, Prince of Hohenzollern-Sigmaringen. 
He was the paternal great-grandfather of Prince Karl of Hohenzollern-Sigmaringen, who became King Carol I of Romania.

Ancestry

References

1762 births
1831 deaths
Princes of Hohenzollern-Sigmaringen